PRIMEtime is a 24-hour English-language pay television channel in Malaysia owned by Astro. The channel airs general entertainment programmes with content primarily on canned shows from the United States.

Alongside its sister channel Showcase Movies, BOO, EGG Network and TA-DAA!, it made its official launch on 15 September 2021 in a response to the closure of the Disney/Fox channels in Southeast Asian region on 1 October 2021 which replaced Kix which ceased broadcasting on 1 July 2022.

Programming
The channel has a line-up of programmes primarily from Paramount Global Distribution Group, Sony Pictures Television and NBCUniversal, in addition to locally-produced English programmes and from Astro's Go Shop block.

Current Programs
 Evil
 Magnum P.I.
 Chicago Fire
 Chicago P.D.
 Chicago Med
 Chucky
 Young Rock
 Law & Order: Special Victims Unit
 Rachael Ray
 Transplant
 Private Eyes
 Survivor
 Nazli
 Magnificent Century
 Celebrity Wheel of Fortune
 Burden of Truth
 Nancy Drew
 Mary Kills People

Former Programs
 Tell Me a Story
 Four Weddings and a Funeral
 The Magicians
 A Discovery of Witches
 Punky Brewster
 Ordinary Joe
 S.W.A.T. (Moved to AXN Asia)
 Kids Say the Darnest Things
 The Affair
 Saved by the Bell
 The Game: Towards Zero
 What in The Malaysia?
 Travel For Love
 Star Vs Food Malaysia
 Best.Ever
 Who Wants to Be a Millionaire (Revival 2020)
 Keeping Up with the Kardashians
 Why Women Kill
 The Royals Revealed
 The Night Shift
 Girls5eva
 Into The Dark
 Riviera

Astro Originals
 Kuasa (Drama)
 Histeria The Series
 Murder By Moonlight
 One Cent Thief (Also aired on Astro Ria, Astro Vinmeen HD & Astro Shuang Xing)
 Kudeta (Also aired on Astro Ria)

References

Astro Malaysia Holdings television channels
Television channels and stations established in 2021
English-language television stations